The Star Beast is a 1954 science fiction novel by Robert A. Heinlein about a high school senior who discovers that his extraterrestrial pet is more than it appears to be. The novel was originally serialised, somewhat abridged (as Star Lummox), in The Magazine of Fantasy & Science Fiction (May, June, July 1954) as Star Lummox and then published in hardcover as part of Scribner's series of Heinlein juveniles.

Plot summary

In the future, Earth has had interstellar spaceflight for centuries and has made contact with numerous extraterrestrial intelligent species.  John Thomas Stuart XI, the teenage protagonist, lives in a small Rocky Mountain town, Westville, caring for Lummox, an extraterrestrial beast his great-grandfather had brought home. Lummox has learned how to speak, and has gradually grown from the size of a collie pup to a ridable behemoth—especially after consuming a used car. The childlike Lummox is perceived to be a neighborhood nuisance and, upon leaving the Stuart property one day, causes substantial property damage across the city. John's widowed mother wants him to get rid of it, and brings an action in the local court to have it destroyed.

Desperate to save his pet, John Thomas considers selling Lummox to a zoo. He rapidly changes his mind and runs away from home, riding into the nearby wilderness on Lummox's back. His girlfriend Betty Sorenson joins him and suggests bringing the beast back into town and hiding it in a neighbor's greenhouse. However, it is not easy to conceal such a large creature. Eventually, the court orders Lummox destroyed. City officials try several methods to kill Lummox but fail, as his alien physiology appears to be virtually invulnerable to ordinary weapons or poisons, and Lummox does not even realize they are attempting to execute him.

Meanwhile, at the Earth government Department of Spacial Affairs, Mr. Kiku, an experienced diplomat, is dealing with the Hroshii, a previously unknown, advanced and powerful alien race. They demand the return of their lost child, or they will destroy Earth. A friendly alien diplomat of a third species intimates that the threat is not an empty one. Initially, no one associates Lummox with the newcomers, in part due to the size difference (Lummox was overfed). Lummox is finally identified as important royalty of the Hroshii, as well as approximately female (the Hroshii have six sexes).  It turns out that the relationship between John Thomas and Lummox is the only thing that saves Earth from destruction.  From her viewpoint, during her centuries on Earth, the young but extremely long-lived Lummox has been pursuing a hobby: the raising of John Thomases. She makes it clear to the other Hroshii that she intends to continue doing so. This gives Mr. Kiku, the chief negotiator, the leverage he needs to pressure the aliens into establishing diplomatic relations. At the insistence of Lummox, the newly married John and Betty accompany her back to the Hroshii homeworld as part of the human diplomatic mission.

Reception
Damon Knight wrote:

Groff Conklin described the novel as "one of Heinlein's most enchanting tales." P. Schuyler Miller found The Star Beast to be "one of the best of 1954."

Editions
The F&SF serialization has a series of illustrations by Fred Kirberger (two covers plus black and white interior art). Although the secondary protagonist Mr. Kiku is clearly portrayed in the text as a black Kenyan, he is illustrated as a white man. None of Kirberger's art depicts Lummox or the other Hroshii except as vague shapes or textures at the edges of some scenes. The original Scribner's hardcover edition has cover art and a frontispiece by Clifford Geary that do depict Lummox.

Some paperback editions and the Science Fiction Book Club hard cover edition omit page 148 of Chapter VIII, "The Sensible Thing to Do", which was in the Scribner's edition and the magazine serialization. In this chapter, John Thomas rereads the entries in his great-grandfather's diary of how Lummox was found. Of significance on the omitted page is that:

The diary skipped a couple of days; the Trail Blazer had made an emergency raise-ship and Assistant Powerman J. T. Stuart had been too busy to write. John Thomas knew why ... the negotiations opened so hopefully with the dominant race had failed ... no one knew why.

The rest of the page summarizes John Thomas' grandfather's family history, discussing the first John Thomas Stuart, who had retired as a sea captain. The history, as reprinted in the paperback and Science Fiction Book Club editions, then resumes with John Thomas Stuart, Junior.

References

External sources

External links

Star Lummox parts one, two, and three on the Internet Archive

1954 American novels
1954 science fiction novels
Novels by Robert A. Heinlein
American science fiction novels
Novels first published in serial form
Works originally published in The Magazine of Fantasy & Science Fiction
Children's science fiction novels